Selište Drežničko  is a village in Croatia. It is connected by the D42 highway.

Populated places in Karlovac County